John Nolland is an Australian Anglican priest and Bible scholar.  He is Tutor in New Testament at Trinity College, Bristol and also holds the title of Visiting Professor at the University of Bristol.

He served in the Anglican Diocese of Sydney and taught at Regent College in British Columbia, Canada. He has a background in science.

His studies focus on the Gospels and he has written books on the Gospels of Luke and Matthew.

Works

Books

Articles and Chapters

Festschrift

External links 
 John Nolland webpage at Trinity College, Bristol

New Testament scholars
Living people
Australian Anglican priests
Bible commentators
Australian biblical scholars
Anglican biblical scholars
Staff of Trinity College, Bristol
Year of birth missing (living people)